Reese Hanneman (born December 25, 1989) is an American cross-country skier. He competed in the 2018 Winter Olympics.

He is a five-time U.S. National Champion, and competed for the United States on the FIS World Cup over six seasons.

Cross-country skiing results
All results are sourced from the International Ski Federation (FIS).

Olympic Games

World Cup

Season standings

References

1989 births
Living people
Cross-country skiers at the 2018 Winter Olympics
American male cross-country skiers
Olympic cross-country skiers of the United States